William Lawrence "Seattle Bill" James (March 12, 1892 – March 10, 1971) was a Major League Baseball pitcher. He was given a nickname to differentiate him from his contemporary, "Big" Bill James.

In 1914, James was an integral member of the "Miracle Braves" team that went from last place to first place in two months, becoming the first team to win a pennant after being in last place on the Fourth of July. In his only full season, James posted a record of 26 wins against 7 losses. The Braves then went on to defeat Connie Mack's heavily favored Philadelphia Athletics in the 1914 World Series. James was 2–0 in the World Series as the Braves recorded the first sweep in Series history. His victory in Game Two was a 1-0 shutout.

During World War I, James was an instructor at bomb-throwing for the US Army. He pitched in the minor leagues until 1925.

Sources

1892 births
1971 deaths
Boston Braves players
Major League Baseball pitchers
Baseball players from California
Seattle Giants players
Portland Beavers players
Galveston Pirates players
Beaumont Oilers players
Saint Mary's Gaels baseball players
Seattle Rainiers players
Beaumont Exporters players
Sacramento Senators players
Chattanooga Lookouts players